The Palm Beach Girl is a 1926 silent romantic comedy film starring Bebe Daniels and directed by Erle C. Kenton. It is based upon the short-lived Broadway play, Please Help Emily, written by H. M. Harwood.

Cast
Bebe Daniels as Emily Bennett
Lawrence Gray as Jack Trotter
Marguerite Clayton as Julia
Josephine Drake as Aunt Jerry
John Patrick as Herbert Moxon (credited as John G. Patrick)
Armand Cortes as Tug Wilson
Royal Byron as Sheriff (credited as Roy Byron)
Maude Turner Gordon as Aunt Beatrice

Preservation
With noprints of The Palm Beach Girl located in any film archives, it is a lost film.

References

External links

The Palm Beach Girl @ IMDb.com
AllMovie.com; synopsis
lobby poster

1926 films
Films directed by Erle C. Kenton
Lost American films
Paramount Pictures films
Films based on British novels
American black-and-white films
American silent feature films
1926 romantic comedy films
American romantic comedy films
1926 lost films
Lost romantic comedy films
1920s American films
Silent romantic comedy films
Silent American comedy films
1920s English-language films